The Intercampo Oil Field is an oil field located in Lake Maracaibo. It was discovered in 1960 and developed by China National Petroleum Corporation. The oil field is operated and owned by China National Petroleum Corporation.

See also

List of oil fields

References 

Oil fields of Venezuela